Annual results of the Louisville Cardinals football team.

Year-by-year results (1946–present)

References

Louisville
Louisville Cardinals football seasons